The Grand Theatre was a historic theatre building located at 401 Green Street in Thibodaux, Louisiana.

Built in the 1920s, the building was a two-story Classical Revival commercial building with a pilastered front. It had a large open auditorium with a second story gallery over the lobby. The building was already vacant at the time of National Register submission in 1986.

It was demolished to make space for a parking lot in June 1995.

The building was listed on the National Register of Historic Places on March 5, 1986.

It was one of 14 individually NRHP-listed properties in the "Thibodaux Multiple Resource Area", which also includes:
Bank of Lafourche Building
Breaux House
Building at 108 Green Street
Chanticleer Gift Shop
Citizens Bank of Lafourche

Lamartina Building
McCulla House
Peltier House
Percy-Lobdell Building
Riviere Building
Riviere House
Robichaux House
St. Joseph Co-Cathedral and Rectory

See also
 National Register of Historic Places listings in Lafourche Parish, Louisiana

References

Commercial buildings on the National Register of Historic Places in Louisiana
Neoclassical architecture in Louisiana
Commercial buildings completed in 1920
Lafourche Parish, Louisiana
National Register of Historic Places in Lafourche Parish, Louisiana